Anolis brunneus, the Crooked-Acklins green anole or Crooked lsland anole , is a species of lizard in the family Dactyloidae. The species is found in the Bahamas.

References

Anoles
Reptiles of the Bahamas
Endemic fauna of the Bahamas
Reptiles described in 1894
Taxa named by Edward Drinker Cope